Emily Gielnik (born 13 May 1992) is an Australian professional soccer player who plays as a forward for Aston Villa of the FA WSL. and the Australia women's national team. She previously played for Brisbane Roar and Melbourne Victory in her native Australia, Liverpool in England, Urawa Red Diamonds in Japan, Avaldsnes IL in Norway, Bayern Munich in Germany, and Vittsjö GIK in Sweden.
On 2 September 2021 she signed for Aston Villa in WSL league

Club career

Brisbane Roar, 2009–2018
Born in Melbourne, Gielnik moved to Queensland at the age of seven. After stopping basketball due to injuries she took up soccer and was eventually signed by Brisbane Roar for the second season of the W–League. At Brisbane she became recognised as a "super sub" for her knack of coming off the substitutes' bench to score late goals. Gielnik played eight seasons at Brisbane, appearing in 83 games and scoring 30 goals. She won the W-League Championship in 2010–11 and the Premiership in 2012–13 and 2017–18.

Liverpool LFC and Ottawa Fury, 2012–2013
In May 2012, Gielnik signed for English club Liverpool L.F.C., during the 2012 FA WSL season. In October 2012, she was one of ten players to be released by Liverpool's new manager Mark Beard. In 2013, Gielnik joined Ottawa Fury for their W-League season.

Urawa Red Diamonds, 2016
After the 2016 Olympics, Gielnik joined Japanese club Urawa Red Diamonds.

Avaldsnes IL, 2017
Gielnik joined Norwegen team Avaldsnes IL for the 2017 season. She had a breakout season with the team, scoring eight goals in league play. Avaldsnes finished second in the Toppserien and won the Norwegian Cup.

Melbourne Victory, 2018–2019
Gielnik signed with Melbourne Victory for the 2018–19 W-League season.

Bayern Munich, 2019–2020
On 23 August 2019, Gielnik joined German Frauen-Bundesliga club Bayern Munich. In July 2020, she left the club after making only 6 appearances, partially due to injury.

Vittsjö, 2020
A week after leaving Bayern Munich, Gielnik signed with another European club, joining Swedish club Vittsjö.

Brisbane Roar, 2020–
In November 2020, Gielnik returned Australia, signing with her hometown club, Brisbane Roar.

International career
Gielnik scored a hat-trick on her international debut for Australia U-19s in October 2011. She made her first appearance for the senior Matildas team in a 3–0 friendly defeat to World champions Japan in Tokyo on 11 July 2012.

Gielnik was named to the Australian squad for 2016 Olympic Qualifying, she scored a goal against Vietnam. Australia won the tournament and qualified for the 2016 Summer Olympics.

Gielnik was part of the Matildas squad that won the 2017 Tournament of Nations and defeated the United States for the first time ever.

At the 2018 AFC Women's Asian Cup Gielnik appeared in three matches for Australia. The Matildas advanced to the final, but lost to Japan 1–0. Australia qualified for the 2019 FIFA Women's World Cup.

In May 2019, Gielnik was named to her first World Cup team. At the World Cup Gielnik appeared in three matches for Australia, starting two of them. In the Round of 16 against Norway, she entered the match as a second-half substitute replacing Hayley Raso. With the match tied 1–1 after extra-time, the game went to penalties. Gielnik was the second penalty taker for Australia, she had her penalty saved. Australia lost to Norway 4–1 on penalties and were eliminated from the World Cup.

Gielnik was selected for the Australian women's football Matildas soccer team which qualified for the Tokyo 2020 Olympics. The Matildas advanced to the quarter-finals with one victory and a draw in the group play. In the quarter-finals they beat Great Britain 4-3 after extra time. However, they lost 1–0 to Sweden in the semi-final and were then beaten 4–3 in the bronze medal playoff by USA. Full details.

Career statistics

International goals

Honors

Club
Brisbane Roar
W-League Championship: 2010–11

Avaldsnes IL
Norwegian Cup: 2017

Melbourne Victory
W-League Premiership: 2018–19

International
Australia
 AFC Olympic Qualifying Tournament: 2016
 Tournament of Nations: 2017
 FFA Cup of Nations: 2019

Individual 

 W-League Golden Boot: 2020−21

References

External links
Profile at FootballAustralia.com.au
 http://cerebra.ca/commercial/ADMINII/users/5222/image/doc/2013-WL-Roster-Numbers-Final.pdf

1992 births
Living people
Australian women's soccer players
Liverpool F.C. Women players
Women's Super League players
Expatriate women's footballers in England
Australian expatriate sportspeople in England
Australian people of Croatian descent
Soccer players from Melbourne
Brisbane Roar FC (A-League Women) players
Melbourne Victory FC (A-League Women) players
A-League Women players
Urawa Red Diamonds Ladies players
Vittsjö GIK players
Nadeshiko League players
Australian expatriate sportspeople in Japan
Avaldsnes IL players
Toppserien players
Australian expatriate sportspeople in Norway
Women's association football forwards
2019 FIFA Women's World Cup players
Australia women's international soccer players
FC Bayern Munich (women) players
Frauen-Bundesliga players
Australian expatriate sportspeople in Germany
Footballers at the 2020 Summer Olympics
Olympic soccer players of Australia
Aston Villa W.F.C. players
Australian expatriate sportspeople in Canada
Expatriate women's soccer players in Canada
Damallsvenskan players
Expatriate women's footballers in Germany
Expatriate women's footballers in Japan
Expatriate women's footballers in Sweden
Expatriate women's footballers in Norway
Australian expatriate women's soccer players
Ottawa Fury (women) players
USL W-League (1995–2015) players
Sportswomen from Queensland
Soccer players from Queensland